Paul Antony Young (born 17 January 1956) is an English musician, singer and songwriter. Formerly the frontman of the short-lived bands Kat Kool & the Kool Cats, Streetband and Q-Tips, he became a teen idol with his solo success in the 1980s. His hit singles include "Love of the Common People", "Wherever I Lay My Hat", "Come Back and Stay", "Every Time You Go Away" and "Everything Must Change", all reaching the top 10 of the UK Singles Chart. Released in 1983, his debut album, No Parlez, the first of three UK number-one albums, made him a household name.

His smooth yet soulful voice belonged to a genre known as "blue-eyed soul". At the 1985 Brit Awards, Young received the award for Best British Male. Associated with the Second British Invasion of the US, "Every Time You Go Away" reached number one on the Billboard Hot 100 in 1985. It also won Best British Video at the 1986 Brit Awards.

In July 1985, Young appeared at Live Aid held at Wembley Stadium, London, performing the Band Aid hit "Do They Know It's Christmas?" (having sung the opening lines on the original single release) and his own hits "Come Back and Stay" and "Every Time You Go Away", with Alison Moyet joining him on stage to perform "That's The Way Love Is". Since the mid-1990s, Young has performed with his band Los Pacaminos.

Early life and career
Paul Young was born in Luton, Bedfordshire, England. He has an older brother, Mark, and a younger sister, Joanne. As a youth, after school, he played football for the Vauxhall Motors factory where he worked and in his spare time played in several bands as a bass guitarist.

The first group for which he became lead singer was Kat Kool & the Kool Kats. In the late 1970s, he joined Streetband, who had one top 20 hit in the UK, with the humorous, novelty track "Toast". In December 1979, Streetband disbanded.

The ex-Streetbanders added new recruits Dave Lathwell on guitar and Baz Watts on drums and became Q-Tips. In addition, a four piece brass section was created by Steve Farr (baritone saxophone), Richard Blanchard (tenor saxophone), Stuart Van Blandamer (alto saxophone) and Tony Hughes (trumpet), who all hailed from the North London and Hertfordshire area, while organist Ian Kewley lived in Essex. Q-Tips' name derived from a well-known brand of cotton buds.

Q-Tips's first rehearsals took place in November 1979. Their first concert was on 18 November 1979 at the Queens Arms Hotel in Harrow. This was followed by another at the Horn of Plenty in St Albans - a regular gig for Streetband during 1978 - and a total of 16 in their first month of existence. Some personnel changes occurred during the first six months, with Blanchard and Lathwell leaving the band.

By 1 April 1980, the band had recorded two tracks, "SYSLJFM (The Letter Song)", and "Having a Party", both recorded at the Livingstone Studios in Barnet. Constant touring and concert appearances had built a strong fan base by mid-1981, when the small amount of soul music covers were outnumbered by the band's own tracks. The professionalism of the band had attracted the attention of several record labels, with the late Mickie Most (RAK Records) confirming on BBC Radio 1's Round Table programme that Q-Tips "...are easily the best live band working at the moment". In August 1980, the British music magazine NME reported that Q-Tips had released their debut, eponymous album.

In time, Garth Watt Roy replaced John Gifford on guitar, and Blandamer was replaced by Nick Payne. This line-up remained for the rest of the band's career. They appeared on BBC Television's In Concert, Rock Goes to College and The Old Grey Whistle Test in the latter part of 1981.  Other television appearances included children's Saturday morning TV. Q-Tips opened for the J. Geils Band, the Knack, Thin Lizzy, Bob Marley and the Average White Band.

The band toured with After the Fire, and supported the Who on their 12-date UK tour in 1980. In 1981, Q-Tips played the Montreux Jazz Festival. With poor record sales after the release of two albums and seven singles, the Q-Tips broke up in early 1982 when Paul Young signed a solo recording contract with CBS. In late 1982 and early 1983, the brass section and drummer of Q-Tips toured with Adam Ant on the UK and US legs of his Friend or Foe tour, and some remained for Ant's 1984 Strip tour.

Young briefly teamed up again with Q-Tips for a reunion tour in 1993.

Solo career and pop stardom
The Q-Tips disbanded in 1982, and Young was signed by Columbia Records as a solo performer. Together with ex-Q-Tips member, songwriter and keyboard player Ian Kewley, Young began writing and recording songs for his debut album, the breakthrough No Parlez.

Young's new backing band The Royal Family included keyboardist Kewley, fretless bass player Pino Palladino, guitarist Steve Bolton, drummer Mark Pinder, and backing singers Maz Roberts and Kim Leslie AKA The Fabulous Wealthy Tarts. His first two singles, "Iron Out the Rough Spots" and a cover of "Love of the Common People", had no success, but the third, a cover of the Marvin Gaye song "Wherever I Lay My Hat", reached No. 1 in the UK Singles Chart for three weeks in the summer of 1983, the first of 14 British Top 40 singles. The song was included on the soundtrack of the 1992 British comedy film Peter's Friends.

Similar success followed all over Europe. In the UK, follow-up single "Come Back and Stay" reached No. 4, and a re-release of "Love of the Common People" made it to No. 2 and even received radio airplay in the United States (thanks to its soundtrack inclusion in John Hughes's film Sixteen Candles), and his debut album No Parlez was certified platinum in various countries.

The year 1984 was difficult for Young, as his first heavy promotional and live concert tour of America strained his vocal cords severely, to the extent that he was forced to rest his voice and did not sing for much of the year. He recovered sufficiently to become involved with the Band Aid single "Do They Know It's Christmas?", an all-star charity project put together by Bob Geldof and Midge Ure for Ethiopian famine relief. Young sang the opening lines of the song as a replacement for David Bowie.

He returned to the UK Top Ten with a version of Ann Peebles' "I'm Gonna Tear Your Playhouse Down". The latter appeared on his second album, The Secret of Association, released in 1985, which secured his future success in the United States, Japan and Australia. The album went to No. 1 in the UK. However, he continued to have occasional voice and throat difficulties. That year, Young scored the biggest worldwide hit of his career with "Every Time You Go Away", a cover of a song from the 1980 Hall & Oates album Voices. "Every Time You Go Away" topped the pop charts in the U.S., and was his biggest success in the U.S. He performed the song during the London segment of the Live Aid concert.

During parts of 1987, Young toured extensively as the opening act for Genesis on their Invisible Touch Tour. Playing more than 35 dates in 13 countries, Young showcased his hits including "Everything Must Change", "I'm Gonna Tear Your Playhouse Down", "Come Back and Stay" and "Everytime You Go Away". This tour concluded on July 1-4, 1987 with four sold out shows featuring more than 350,000 fans at Wembley Stadium (1923) in London.

In 1990, he released a cover of The Chi-Lites' "Oh Girl", which peaked at No. 8 on the Billboard Hot 100.

He continued to have a successful career, with some highlights such as singing the Crowded House track "Don't Dream It's Over" at the Nelson Mandela 70th Birthday Tribute in 1988, producing a popular duet, "Senza una donna (Without a Woman)," with Italian blues singer Zucchero in 1991, and singing "Radio Ga Ga" with the surviving members of Queen in 1992, at The Freddie Mercury Tribute Concert soon after Freddie Mercury died. In 1991, he recorded a duet with Irish group Clannad for the Blake Edwards film Switch, a cover of the Joni Mitchell song, "Both Sides Now".

"Don't Dream It's Over", "Senza una donna (Without a Woman)" and "Both Sides Now" were featured on his first greatest hits album From Time To Time – The Singles Collection, released in 1991. The album included the hit singles from Young's first four solo albums, the three above-mentioned songs, and a previously unreleased selection called "I'm Only Foolin' Myself".

Later career
In 1992, Young formed a new group Los Pacaminos based on the sounds of Ry Cooder's "Chicken Skin Music” era and the Tex-Mex group the Texas Tornados, and they first performed low-key events in bars and clubs before progressing to theatres. In 1993, Young was dropped from his contract with the CBS/Sony Records label, and afterward, released fewer solo albums. He reformed the Q-Tips for a short series of concerts that year. He contributed to the Vangelis album Voices in 1995. Young sang the British national anthem, "God Save the Queen", at Wembley Stadium before England's Euro '96 semi-final match against Germany.

In 1996, Young was again performing solo and preparing for his next album, Paul Young, which was released the following year on East West Records. In November 2001, when Young was on the final night of the Here and Now tour, Michael Aspel awarded him his This is Your Life book. The show went out on BBC One on 5 December that year. 2006 saw the release of Rock Swings – On the Wild Side of Swing. In September 2006, he appeared in the BBC1 cooking show Celebrity MasterChef, and won his show, allowing him a place in the semi-finals. A year later, he was a contestant on another cooking show, ITV's Hell's Kitchen.

Although his musical career had begun to decline, Young began to make more appearances in the media. He appeared as a guest on shows including The Wright Stuff, This Morning and The One Show. In 2010, Young recorded and released a new track "Come Back", a duet he did with electronic dance music act Chicane. The single was a sample of Young's 1983 hit "Come Back and Stay", and charted at 151 on the UK Singles Chart. The single was recorded onto Chicane's 2010 album Giants. After a lengthy absence of recorded material, Young released an album of vintage soul songs in 2016 called Good Thing produced by Arthur Baker, and began a lengthy period of tours and festival appearances. He still is touring around the world with his band.

Los Pacaminos

Young first formed Los Pacaminos in 1993. The reason for the group forming was Young's desire to get back to basics, as he explains "I was between record labels and writing material for a new album but I wanted to play live again. I've always loved the Tex-Mex sound and knew a few musicians who had a similar passion for this type of music. So I asked them to join me in forming a band.

The group’s early performances were in bars and clubs, performing a mixture of their own material and covers. The album Los Pacaminos was released in 2002.

Upon the release of the album, the band established themselves as a professional line-up, consisting of:
 Young on guitar and vocals
 Drew Barfield on guitar and vocals
 Melvyn Duffy on pedal steel guitar
 Steve Greetham or David Levy on bass and vocals
 Matt Irving on keyboards, accordion and vocals
 Jamie Moses on guitar and vocals
 Mark Pinder or Jim Russel on drums

The band continued to perform and record throughout Europe and the UK. In 2014, the band released their second album A Fistful of Statins.

Other media released by the band include an EP and a live album. In 2015, member Matt Irving died. The band, however, continues to tour and record.

Collaborations
Paul Young’s earliest collaboration was in the late 1970s on Streetband’s first album London when Ian Dury made a guest appearance on the track "Mystery". Then, in between the Q-Tips and his solo deal, Paul sang backing vocals on the Squeeze single "Black Coffee in Bed" with Elvis Costello. Young's best known musical collaboration (apart from Los Pacaminos) was with his early collaboration with bassist Pino Palladino. Palladino, who had collaborated with Tears for Fears, Go West and Gary Numan, featured on four of Young's albums: No Parlez, The Secret of Association, The Crossing and Paul Young. Young released a version of the song "Both Sides, Now" with Irish group Clannad for the 1991 motion picture Switch.

Palladino was the bass player in Young's backing band The Royal Family and played at Live Aid.

Personal life
Young met his wife, former model Stacey Smith, on his video for "Come Back and Stay" in 1983.  They married while they were living in Los Angeles in November 1987. They had three children: daughters Levi (born March 1987), Layla (born August 1994), and son Grady Cole (born January 1996). Young and Smith split up in May 2006 and then reconciled in March 2009. On 26 January 2018, it was announced that Stacey Young had died of brain cancer, aged 52. Paul lives in London.

Young is a close friend of singer and former Spandau Ballet front man Tony Hadley. The two toured Australia and New Zealand during October and November 2008.

Discography

No Parlez (1983)
The Secret of Association (1985)
Between Two Fires (1986)
Other Voices (1990)
The Crossing (1993)
Reflections (1994)
Paul Young (1997)
Rock Swings – On the Wild Side of Swing (2006)
Good Thing (2016)

References

External links

 
 

1956 births
Living people
20th-century English male singers
20th-century English singers
21st-century English male singers
21st-century English singers
CBS Records artists
Columbia Records artists
English male singer-songwriters
English new wave musicians
English pop rock singers
English pop singers
English rock singers
English soul singers
Los Pacaminos members
MCA Records artists
Male new wave singers
People educated at Ashcroft High School
People from Luton
Second British Invasion artists